Yevul (lit. Crop) is a moshav in southern Israel. Located in the Hevel Shalom area of the north-western Negev desert near the Gaza Strip–Egypt border, it falls under the jurisdiction of Eshkol Regional Council.

History
The village was established in 1981 by evacuees from Sinai. In 2005, three quarters of the former residents of Netzarim who were evicted from their village due to Israel's unilateral disengagement plan moved to temporary housing in Yevul while permanent housing is to be planned in the area.

References

Moshavim
Agricultural Union
Populated places established in 1981
Gaza envelope
Populated places in Southern District (Israel)
1981 establishments in Israel